ZGH may refer to:
 Copenhagen Central Station, with the IATA code ZGH
 Standard Moroccan Berber language, which has the ISO 639 language code zgh
 Zagreb Holding, a company in Croatia
 Zarghun railway station in Pakistan, with the code ZGH
 Zindagi Gulzar Hai, Pakistani TV drama
 Zoltan Hajos, a Hungarian American organic chemist